Abercrombie is a Scottish surname, and may refer to:

 Cecil Abercrombie (1886–1916), British rugby player and cricketer
 Charles Abercrombie Smith (1834–1919), South African scientist and politician
 David Abercrombie (linguist) (1909–1992), British phonetician
 David T. Abercrombie (1867–1931), American businessman and founder of the company Abercrombie & Fitch
 Frank Abercrombie (1850–1939), American baseball player
 Gordon Abercrombie, Australian rugby league player
 E. Wayne Abercrombie (born 1938), American choral director
 Ian Abercrombie (1934–2012), British actor
 James Abercrombie (disambiguation), various people
 Jeff Abercrombie (born 1969), American musician, co-founder of the hard-rock band Fuel
 Jim Abercrombie (1880–1948), Australian rugby league player
 Joe Abercrombie (born 1974), British fantasy writer
 John Abercrombie (disambiguation), the name of several people
 Josephine Abercrombie (1926–2022), American horse breeder
 Lascelles Abercrombie (1881–1938), British poet and literary critic
 Michael Abercrombie (1912–1979), British cell biologist and embryologist
 Minnie Abercrombie (1909–1984), British zoologist
 Neil Abercrombie (born 1938), American politician and Governor of Hawaii
 Patrick Abercrombie (1879–1957), British town-planner, responsible for the Abercrombie Plan for the redevelopment of post-war London
 Percy Abercrombie (1884–1964), Australian rules footballer
 Reggie Abercrombie (born 1980), American baseball player
 Thomas Abercrombie (disambiguation), the name of several people
 Walter Abercrombie (born 1959), American football player

See also 
 Abercrombie (disambiguation)
 Abercromby (name)

References 

Scottish surnames